Braničevo District League is a section of the District Leagues, Serbia's fifth football league. The league is operated by the Football Association of Serbia.

The league consists of 16 clubs from Braničevo District which play each other in a double round-robin league, with each club playing the other club home and away. At the end of the season the top club will be promoted to Dunav Zone League.

2011–12 teams
FK Šapine
FK VGSK Veliko Gradište
FK Mladost Biskuplje
FK Železničar Požarevac
FK Beli Orao Bradarac
FK Petar Dobrnjac Dobrnje
FK Integral Batuša
FK Omladinac Šetonje
FK Vihor Maljurevac
FK Polet Suvi Do
FK Crni Vrh Miljević
FK Mlava Malo Laole
FK Mladi Borac Majilovac
FK Sloga Burovac
FK Sloga Kasidol
FK Dragoš Oreškovica

See also
Serbia national football team
Serbian Superliga
Serbian First League
Serbian League
Zone Leagues

5

sr:Зона Дунав у фудбалу